Thirumittacode may refer to

 Thirumittacode-I, a village in Palakkad district, Kerala, India
 Thirumittacode-II, a village in Palakkad district, Kerala, India
 Thirumittacode (gram panchayat), a gram panchayat serving the above villages
 Thirumittacode inscription, a Chola record from Thirumittacode